Thillayadi  is a town located in Puttalam District, North Western Province, Sri Lanka. It is a multi-cultural community. The town's population consists mainly of Muslims.

Thillayadi is located near Puttalam and the A3 Highway (Puttalam-Colombo Road).

Schools 

Thillayadi Muslim Maha Vidhyalaya
 Annsari Muslim Maha Vidhyalaya

Temples 

 Thillayadi Mohideen Jumma Masjith
 Vellankanni Church
 Thillayadi Murugan Kovil

References

External links 

 தில்லையடி பிரதேசம்
 தில்லையடி பாடசாலை

Towns in Puttalam District